Béla Szeift (1944, Gödöllő – 2012) well known as a Hungarian sculptor, graphic artist, and painter.
 
Béla Szeift learned from János Kmetty sculpture. Béla started exhibit, when he was 22 years old. He presented his sculptors in France and many Hungarian galleries. 
Béla Szeift participated with his metal art sculptor in the International Steel Sculpture Workshop and Symposium in 1987.
From 1969 he applicated objects to his works, he creates objects also, he effectuated the In memoriam Lajos Kassák object. Géza Bene effected to Béla Szeift's art. 
He represented his applications in Derkovits Club in 1969 with Árpád Szabados, Emil Parrag, András Orvos etc.

Béla Szeift's art
 1968 – Stúdió '68, Kunsthalle, Budapest
 1978 Outdoor Sculpture Exhibition, Budapest
 1976 Vajda LSG, Szentendre
 1975 Stúdió '75, Ernst Museum, Budapest
 1993–97 – I-III. National Pastel Biennial, Balassa Bálint Museum, Christian Museum, Esztergom

References

Links
 bio of Béla Szeift

1944 births
2012 deaths
Hungarian sculptors
People from Gödöllő